The Syracuse Orange women represented Syracuse University in CHA women's ice hockey during the 2012-13 NCAA Division I women's ice hockey season. It was the program's most successful season. The goaltending duo of Kallie Billadeau and Jenesica Drinkwater registered 8 shutouts between them.

Offseason
August 30: Alumnus Stefanie Marty was a member of the Bronze Medal winning Swiss National Team at the IIHF World Championship Series.

Recruiting

Standings

Roster

2013–14 Orange

Schedule

|-
!colspan=12 style="background:#0a2351; "| Regular Season

|-
!colspan=12 style="background:#0a2351; "| CHA Tournament

Awards and honors

Head Coach Paul Flanagan was named the CHA Coach of the Year. Flanagan earned his 300th career win on February 27.

Junior Defense Akane Hosoyamada was named to the All-CHA First Team, along with Junior Goaltender Kallie Billadeau.

Sophomore forward Nicole Ferrera and junior forward Margot Scharfe were named to the Second Team.

Defender Nicole Renault was named to the All-Rookie Team.

References

Syracuse
Syracuse Orange women's ice hockey seasons
Syracuse Orange
Syracuse Orange